Minnie Gonzalez (born August 4, 1950) is an American politician who has been a member of the Connecticut House of Representatives since 1997, serving the 3rd district in Hartford. She is the Deputy Majority Leader since 2017.

Personal life 
Gonzalez was born in Adjuntas, Puerto Rico into a family of seven siblings. She graduated from Adjuntas High School. In 1981 Gonzalez migrated to the United States, where she worked as a Special Deputy Sheriff at the West Hartford Superior Court in Connecticut and as an Assistant Registrar of Voters. She is married to Ramon L. Arroyo, and she has two sons and one daughter.

Political career
In 1986, Gonzalez was elected to the Hartford Town Committee. Ten years later she was elected to the Connecticut House of Representatives for the 3rd district, which is composed of the Parkville, Frog Hollow and Behind the Rocks neighborhoods in Hartford. She served as the Assistant Majority Leader from 2003 to 2004, as Assistant Majority Whip from 2005 to 2006, as Deputy Majority Whip-at-Large from 2007 to 2014, as Chief Majority Whip from 2015 to 2016 and as Deputy Majority Leader since 2017.

Gonzales serves on the Appropriations, Housing and the Public Safety and Security Committees.

She ran for mayor of Hartford in 2007.

Political views and accomplishments

Education
Gonzalez wants to invest more in technical high schools, and to established free community college for Connecticut residents.

Family court reform
Gonzalez is an advocate for family court reform. She has sponsored legislation to create a rebuttable legal presumption that shared parenting is in the best interest of children with divorced parents, with exceptions for child abuse and neglect.  She has also sponsored legislation concerning parental alienation, to define it as a form of child abuse and to help children reconnected with their alienated mother or father. In 2014, Gonzalez worked to enact a law to limit the use of guardian ad litems. In 2019, she sponsored a bill to limit their use outside of severe cases identified by the Department of Children and Families. Together with republican Prasad Srinivasan and democrat Ed Gomes, Gonzalez was one of only three members of the Judiciary Committee voting against the 2018 reconfirmation of the controversial family court judge Jane B. Emons, who was not reconfirmed despite the positive committee vote. In 2019, she organized a public hearing on parental alienation and family court reform.

Health
When governor Dannel Malloy proposed to cut Medicaid for single people in 2012, Gonzalez objected, asking: We want to fix our budget on the backs of poor people?.

Housing
Together with representative Jason Rojas, Gonzalez sponsored a 2015 housing bill that would have required at least 75 percent of all new affordable housing projects to be built in affluent neighborhoods, in order to reverse the pattern of only building federally subsidized low-income housing in the poorest neighborhoods. Despite attention from the New York Times, the bill died without receiving a vote.

Law enforcement
Gonzalez has supported the use of police body cameras, to protect both police officers and citizens by providing objective truths about police engagements.

In a very unusual success, Gonzalez was a lead legislator preventing the 2018 re-appointment of judge Jane B. Emons, who had originally been appointed by governor Jodi Rell and proposed for reappointment by governor Dannel Malloy.

Minimum wage
Representative Gonzalez supports an increase of the minimum wage to $15 an hour. In 2019, she sponsored legislation that would increase the  minimum wage from $10.10 to $11 in 2019 and then by another dollar each year until it reaches $15 in 2023.

Marijuana
In 2019 Gonzalez has sponsored legislation to permit the sale and taxation of marijuana to adults over the age of 21, with some of the new tax proceeds earmarked to curb the opioids epidemic.

References

1950 births
Living people
Democratic Party members of the Connecticut House of Representatives
Politicians from Hartford, Connecticut
Hispanic and Latino American state legislators in Connecticut
Hispanic and Latino American women in politics
American politicians of Puerto Rican descent
People from Adjuntas, Puerto Rico
21st-century American politicians
Women state legislators in Connecticut
21st-century American women politicians